Angeltown or Angel Town may also refer to:

Places
Angel Town, nickname for Los Angeles

Film
Angel Town (film), 1990 American martial arts film

Comics
Angeltown (comics), 2005 comic book series
Angeltown, a location in Trifecta (Judge Dredd story)

Music
Angeltown, 1996 album by Richard Clapton
Angeltown, compilation album released by Orchid Tapes
"Angel Town", song from The Great Lakes (album)
 "Angeltown", official city song of Los Angeles